Pillinger may refer to:

 Colin Pillinger (1943–2014), a British planetary scientist
 15614 Pillinger, an asteroid
 Pillinger, Tasmania, an abandoned port